Nikos Kalofiris (born 22 October 1970) is a Greek cross-country skier. He competed in the men's 10 kilometre classical event at the 1994 Winter Olympics.

References

External links
 

1970 births
Living people
Greek male cross-country skiers
Olympic cross-country skiers of Greece
Cross-country skiers at the 1994 Winter Olympics
People from Metsovo
Sportspeople from Epirus (region)